Voronove may refer to the following places in Ukraine:

Voronove, Dnipropetrovsk Oblast, village in Synelnykove Raion
Voronove, Luhansk Oblast, urban-type settlement in Sievierodonetsk Raion